Soto station is an underground light rail station on the L Line of the Los Angeles Metro Rail system. It is located underneath 1st Street at its intersection with Soto Street in the heart of the Boyle Heights neighborhood of Los Angeles. This station opened in 2009 as part of the Gold Line Eastside Extension and was one of two underground stations on the Eastside Extension (the other being Mariachi Plaza). This station and all the other Eastside Extension stations will be part of the E Line upon completion of the Regional Connector project in 2023.

Service

Station layout 
This station is one of two underground stations on the Eastside portion of the L Line (the other being Mariachi Plaza). There are two levels underground: a mezzanine with ticket machines and gates, and below that, an island platform with two tracks. There is one entrance to the station located at the intersection of 1st Street and South Soto Street.

Hours and frequency

Connections 
, the following connections are available:

References

External links 

L Line (Los Angeles Metro) stations
Boyle Heights, Los Angeles
Eastside Los Angeles
Railway stations in the United States opened in 2009